Maksim Yurevich Sokolov (born 29 September 1968) is a Russian economist and politician who was the Minister for Transportation, from 21 May 2012 to 7 May 2018.

Biography

Early life
Sokolov was born on September 29, 1969, in Leningrad. He served in the army from 1987 to 1989. In 1991, he graduated with honors from St. Petersburg State University with a degree in economics.

Career 
Between 1991 and 1993, Sokolov worked as a lecturer in the department of economics at St. Petersburg State University.

In 2008 he defended his doctoral thesis in economics. According to examination made by Dissernet, this doctoral thesis contains gross undocumented plagiarism from two other doctoral theses.

In 2011, Sokolov became professor and chair of the department of the Higher Management School of Saint Petersburg State University.

Business
In 1992, he became Chairman of the "Rossi" Company. In 1999 and 2004 he became Chairman of "Corporation S", a company that builds elite homes in St Petersburg.

Political career
In 2004, he began working in the Administration of Saint Petersburg as Head of Committee for Strategic Projects of the Municipal government. In 2009, he was a member of the municipal government, as Chairman of Committee for Economic Development, Industrial policy and Trade.

In 2009, he moved to Moscow and on December 4 of the same year he became the Director of Department for Industry and Infrastructures of the Government of Russia. In May 2012, he was appointed as Minister of Transportation by Dmitry Medvedev.

Personal life
He is married and has three sons.

Honours and awards 
 Medal of the Order "For Merit" 2nd class

References

Russian economists
1968 births
Living people
Government ministers of Russia
Politicians from Saint Petersburg